The Folk Project of New Jersey is a not-for-profit folk music, storytelling and dance organization which sponsors or organizes a wide variety of folk activities in the Northern New Jersey area.

Since its incorporation in 1976, the Folk Project has promoted folk music through activities including the weekly Troubadour Acoustic Concert Series in Morristown; the Swingin’ Tern contra dance; twice-yearly folk festivals held at a camp in the woods of northwest New Jersey, monthly music parties held in members' homes, occasional Special Concerts,  the New Jersey Storytelling Festival, and the cable TV show "...Horses Sing None of it!"

Local, national and international artists have been featured at Folk Project events, including the Tannehill Weavers, Richard Shindell, Bob Franke, Odetta, Christine Lavin, Roy Book Binder, Dave Van Ronk, U. Utah Phillips. Folk Project members such as Mike Agranoff have performed at large folk festivals such as the Philadelphia Folk Festival and the Champlain Valley Festival in Vermont, and local and regional folk music venues too numerous to count.

The Folk Project is an organization for people who love to hear or play  music—folk music in its broadest context, which may include rock and roll as well as traditional genres. Members are known as "Projectiles."

The Folk Project has been featured in articles in such publications as the Newark Star-Ledger, the Bergen Record and Morristown Daily Record.

External links
The Folk Project website

Non-profit organizations based in New Jersey
Music organizations based in the United States
American folk music
Contra dance